Suzanne Massie (née Rohrbach; born January 8, 1931) is an American scholar of Russian history who played an important role in the relations between Ronald Reagan and the Soviet Union in the final years of the Cold War.

In mid-May 2021, she asked Russian President Vladimir Putin to grant her Russian citizenship. In an NTV broadcast, she previously said that the American media hate Russia.

Biography
Massie is the daughter of a Swiss diplomat. She was born in New York and graduated from Vassar College, but also studied at the Sorbonne and the Institute of Political Studies in Paris.

In 1975, Suzanne Massie and her then-husband Robert K. Massie chronicled their experiences as the parents of a hemophiliac child, Robert Kinloch Massie IV, and the significant differences between the American and French health-care systems in their jointly written book, Journey. Journey followed her husband's 1967 book, Nicholas and Alexandra, a biography of the last Emperor and Empress of Russia, whose son also was born with haemophilia.

Reagan first became interested in Massie when he read her book Land of the Firebird: The Beauty of Old Russia. She eventually visited the White House, where she became an informal messenger between the President and Mikhail Gorbachev and his administration. She also asked Reagan to learn the now famous Russian phrase "Doveryai, no proveryai", which translates as "Trust, but verify". Her importance in contributing to Reagan's understanding of the Russian people, assisting in reaching a peaceful end to the Cold War, was described in detail in a number of documentary films. She applied for the job of US Ambassador to Russia via a letter to Reagan but was rejected, as the post had already been filled.

A fellow of the Harvard Russian Research Center (now the Davis Center) from 1985 to 1997, Massie has also served on the board of the International League for Human Rights. In 1991 she was appointed as the only lay member of the Permanent Episcopal-Orthodox Coordinating Committee, which has involved bi-annual discussions in Russia and the United States with hierarchs of the church, including Patriarch Aleksy II.

In 2021 Suzanne Massie travelled to Moscow to attend Victory Day celebration, and in an interview with Russian broadcaster NTV, she asked Putin for a Russian passport: "If President Vladimir Vladimirovich [Putin] finds it possible to grant me Russian citizenship, it will be an honor for me". She was granted Russian citizenship on December 30, 2021.

Personal life
She was married to Robert Massie from 1954 to 1990, when they divorced; they had three children. She remarried to Seymour Papert, a researcher of artificial intelligence and education theory associated with the Massachusetts Institute of Technology, in 1994 or 1995.

Books
Massie, Suzanne, Trust but Verify: Reagan, Russia and Me, Maine Authors Publishing, 2013: Paperback and Hardcover.
Massie, Suzanne, Land of the Firebird: The Beauty of Old Russia, Simon & Schuster 1980: Paperback; Touchstone 1982.
Massie, Suzanne, Pavlovsk: The Life of a Russian Palace, Little Brown & Co. 1990: Paperback; HeartTree Press 1999.
Massie, Suzanne, The Living Mirror, Doubleday & Co. Garden City New York 1972: Paperback: Anchor 1972.
Massie, Suzanne & Robert Massie, Journey, Alfred A. Knopf, New York 1975: Paperback: Warner's 1976; Ballantine Books 1984.

References

External links

Suzanne Liselotte Massie (Rohrbach), Geni.com

1931 births
Living people
American memoirists
American women writers
American people of Swiss descent
Harvard Fellows
Historians of Russia
People of the Cold War
Ronald Reagan
Soviet Union–United States relations
Vassar College alumni
Writers from New York City
20th-century American Episcopalians
Naturalised citizens of Russia